Joanne Gay Goodhew (born 1961) is a New Zealand politician. She served as a member of Parliament between 2005 and 2017.

Early years
Goodhew grew up in Timaru, and attended Timaru Girls' High School. She holds a qualification in nursing from Otago Polytechnic and had a career in nursing before working as health sciences tutor at Aoraki Polytechnic. Before entering politics she was involved in a variety of health organisations in the Otago region.

Member of Parliament

In the 2005 election, Goodhew was a candidate for the National Party, standing in the Aoraki electorate and being ranked 31st on the party list. She won the Aoraki seat and entered Parliament.

In the 2008 election, most of Aoraki was moved to the new Rangitata electorate. It was suggested that this could make the electorate vulnerable to capture by Labour; however, Goodhew won the new electorate with an increased majority.

Goodhew was elected National Party junior whip in 2009, after Internal Affairs minister Richard Worth resigned and was replaced by senior whip Nathan Guy (who was in turn replaced by junior whip Chris Tremain).

Goodhew was returned as MP for Rangitata at the 2011 general election, though with a slightly reduced majority. Goodhew was additionally made a minister outside of Cabinet, holding the Community and Voluntary Sector, Senior Citizens and Women's Affairs portfolios.

She was reappointed as a minister, retaining the Community and Voluntary Sector portfolio and additionally becoming Minister for Food Safety and an associate minister with responsibility for social development and primary industries.

On 20 December 2016, Goodhew lost her ministerial portfolios in a reshuffle after the resignation of Prime Minister John Key. She was succeeded as National's candidate and Rangitata MP by Andrew Falloon.

Later career 
After leaving Parliament, Goodhew contested and was elected to the South Canterbury District Health Board in the 2019 local elections.

References

External links
Official website

|-

|-

|-

1961 births
Living people
New Zealand National Party MPs
Women government ministers of New Zealand
New Zealand nurses
People from Timaru
Government ministers of New Zealand
Women's ministers
New Zealand MPs for South Island electorates
Members of the New Zealand House of Representatives
People from Temuka
Otago Polytechnic alumni
People educated at Timaru Girls' High School
New Zealand women nurses
21st-century New Zealand politicians
21st-century New Zealand women politicians
Women members of the New Zealand House of Representatives